John Atkinson (20 December 1913 – 1977) was an English professional footballer who played as a centre half.

Career 
He began his career in amateur football with Washington Colliery before signing for Football League side Bolton Wanderers in 1931. Atkinson spent 17 years with the Bolton club, making 240 league appearances and scoring 4 goals. In 1948, he was appointed player-manager of Third Division North outfit New Brighton, where he stayed for two seasons, playing a further 52 league games before leaving the club in the summer of 1950.

Personal life 
During the Second World War, Atkinson served with the 53rd (Bolton) Field Regiment. He took part in the invasion of Italy on 24 September 1943 as a truck driver, transporting ammunition and equipment.

References

External links

1913 births
1977 deaths
People from Washington, Tyne and Wear
Footballers from Tyne and Wear
English footballers
Bolton Wanderers F.C. players
New Brighton A.F.C. players
New Brighton A.F.C. managers
English Football League players
English Football League managers
English Football League representative players
Association football wing halves
English football managers